William "Bill" Donald Ross (born July 6, 1928) is an American water polo player who competed in the 1956 Summer Olympics. He was born in Toronto, Canada. Ross was a member of the American water polo team which finished fifth in the 1956 tournament. He played all six matches. In 1983, he was inducted into the USA Water Polo Hall of Fame.

References

External links
 

1928 births
Living people
American male water polo players
Olympic water polo players of the United States
Water polo players at the 1956 Summer Olympics
Sportspeople from Toronto
Canadian male water polo players